Zagami is the largest single Martian meteorite ever found, weighing about . According to Ron Baalke of NASA/JPL, "The Zagami meteorite is the most easily obtainable SNC meteorite available to collectors,"
 referring to the SNC classification of meteorites (Shergottites, Nakhlites, Chassignites), of which Martian meteorites belong.

References

Meteorites by name
Martian meteorites